The Faculty of Law of Sorocaba is a law school in the state of Sao Paulo and Brazil is in Sorocaba.

References

Sorocaba
Universities and colleges in São Paulo (state)
Law schools in Brazil
Educational institutions established in 1957
1957 establishments in Brazil